George-Alexis Montandon (19 April 1879 – August 1944) was a Swiss French anthropologist. He was a proponent of scientific racism prior to World War II. During the German occupation of France, he was responsible for the anti-Semitic exhibition Le Juif et la France.

Ethnologist at the Musée de l'Homme , theoretician of racism, collaborator and anti- Semite, he was one of the guarantors of a so-called "scientific" racism before the Second World War. However, even under Vichy, he and the movement to which he belonged with René Martial remained marginal in the French intellectual world.

References 

1879 births
1944 deaths
Antisemitism in France
French anthropologists
People of Vichy France
Proponents of scientific racism
Nazi propagandists
Hoaxers